The Best Footballer in Asia 2013 was the inaugural Best Footballer in Asia. Based upon the voting of a panel of 22 journalists the winner was Keisuke Honda. On March 16, 2014, the trophy was conferred to Keisuke Honda by Luo Ming, the deputy chief editor of Titan Sports in San Siro stadium.

Voting
The panel was constituted by 18 journalists from AFC nations/regions including Australia, Bangladesh, Hong Kong, India, Indonesia, Japan, Jordan, Kuwait, Macao, Qatar, Palestine Saudi Arabia, Tajikistan, Thailand, Turkmenistan, United Arabic Emirates, Uzbekistan, Vietnam and 4 journalists from England, France, Germany and Italy representing non-AFC media outlets.

Rankings

References 

2013
2013 awards
2013 in Asian football